Mangelia costulata is a species of sea snail, a marine gastropod mollusk in the family Mangeliidae, the cone snails and their allies.

Description
The shell is longitudinally ribbed continuing to the base of the body whorl, crossed by spiral striae. The sinus is broad and shallow. Its color is chestnut or horny brown, interior similarly colored.

Distribution
This species occurs in European waters and in the Mediterranean Sea.

References

 Backeljau, T. (1986). Lijst van de recente mariene mollusken van België [List of the recent marine molluscs of Belgium]. Koninklijk Belgisch Instituut voor Natuurwetenschappen: Brussels, Belgium. 106 pp
 Howson, C.M.; Picton, B.E. (Ed.) (1997). The species directory of the marine fauna and flora of the British Isles and surrounding seas. Ulster Museum Publication, 276. The Ulster Museum: Belfast, UK. . vi, 508 (+ cd-rom) pp
 Gofas, S.; Le Renard, J.; Bouchet, P. (2001). Mollusca, in: Costello, M.J. et al. (Ed.) (2001). European register of marine species: a check-list of the marine species in Europe and a bibliography of guides to their identification. Collection Patrimoines Naturels, 50: pp. 180–213
 Muller, Y. (2004). Faune et flore du littoral du Nord, du Pas-de-Calais et de la Belgique: inventaire. [Coastal fauna and flora of the Nord, Pas-de-Calais and Belgium: inventory]. Commission Régionale de Biologie Région Nord Pas-de-Calais: France. 307 pp

External links
 Risso A. (1826–1827). Histoire naturelle des principales productions de l'Europe Méridionale et particulièrement de celles des environs de Nice et des Alpes Maritimes. Paris, Levrault: Vol. 1: XII + 448 + 1 carta [1826]. Vol. 2: VII + 482 + 8 pl. (fiori) [novembre 1827]. Vol. 3: XVI + 480 + 14 pl. (pesci) [settembre 1827]. Vol. 4: IV + 439 + 12 pl. (molluschi) [novembre 1826]. Vol. 5: VIII + 400 + 10 pl. (altri invertebrati) [Novembre 1827] 
  Tucker, J.K. 2004 Catalog of recent and fossil turrids (Mollusca: Gastropoda). Zootaxa 682:1–1295.
 
 Lectotype at MNHN, Paris
 MNHN, Paris: syntype

costulata
Gastropods described in 1826